The 231st Signal Battalion "Sempione" is an inactive signals unit of the Italian Army. The battalion was formed in 1959 and assigned to the Armored Division "Centauro". In 1975 the battalion was named for the Simplon Pass and received the number 231st, which had been used by the 231st Connections Company that served with the 131st Armored Division "Centauro" during the Tunisian Campaign of World War II. With the name and number the battalion also received its own flag. In 1991 the battalion was disbanded and in 2001 reformed as the second signal battalion of the deployable 1st Signal Regiment.

History 
On 5 June 1936 a Mixed Engineer Platoon was formed for the I Motor-mechanized Brigade. On 15 July 1937 the platon was expanded to Mixed Engineer Company and on the same date the brigade was renamed I Armored Brigade. On 20 April 1939 the brigade was renamed 131st Armored Division "Centauro" and the company was renamed 131st Mixed Engineer Company. The personnel for the company was trained by the 7th Engineer Regiment in Florence.

World War II 

In 1940 the 131st Armored Division "Centauro" fought in the Greco-Italian War and in 1941 it participated in the Invasion of Yugoslavia. In October 1942 the division was transferred to Libya to participate in the Western Desert Campaign. The division did not participate in the Second Battle of El Alamein and the first units of the division arrived at the front during the retreat from Egypt in late 1942.

In early 1943 the 131st Mixed Engineer Company was split to form the 131st Engineer Company and the 231st Connections Company, which both entered the newly formed XXXI Mixed Engineer Battalion. In 1943 the Centauro participated in the Tunisian Campaign and fought in the Battle of El Guettar, where it was severely decimated. From 7 April 1943 the division's remaining personnel and equipment were assigned to the 16th Infantry Division "Pistoia". On 18 April 1943 the Centauro was declared lost due to wartime events.

Cold War 

In 1951 the Italian Army formed the Armored Brigade "Centauro" in Verona. The brigade included a connections platoon that grew over the next years into a company. In 1955 the company moved with the brigade headquarter to the city of Novara. On 1 April 1959 the company was expanded to Signal Battalion "Centauro", which consisted of a command, a command platoon, and two signal companies. On 1 November 1959 the brigade was expanded to Armored Division "Centauro".

During the 1975 army reform the army disbanded the regimental level and newly independent battalions were granted for the first time their own flags. During the reform signal battalions were renamed for mountain passes. On 20 October 1975 the Signal Battalion "Centauro" was renamed 231st Signal Battalion "Sempione". After the reform the battalion consisted of a command, a command and services platoon, two signal companies, and a repairs and recovery platoon. On 12 November 1976 the battalion was granted a flag by decree 846 of the President of the Italian Republic Giovanni Leone.

In 1986 the Armored Division "Centauro was disbanded and therefore on 1 August 1986 the battalion was transferred to the 3rd Army Corps' Signal Command. On 1 June 1989 the battalion was reorganized and now consisted of a command, a command and services company, the 1st and 2nd radio relay companies, and the 3rd Signal Center Company.

With the end of the Cold War the Italian Army began to draw down its forces and on 15 May 1991 the battalion was disbanded. On 29 June 1991 the flag of the 231st Signal Battalion "Sempione" was transferred to the Shrine of the Flags in the Vittoriano in Rome.

Recent times 
On 27 August 2001 the battalion was reformed as Battalion "Sempione" and assigned to the 1st Signal Regiment as the regiment's second signal battalion.

References

Signal Regiments of Italy